Ilija Stanojević (7 August 1859 – 8 August 1930) was one of the most prominent Serbian actors of the early 20th century. In 1911, Stanojević co-founded the Union for the Production of Serbian Films with Svetozar Botorić. The same year, he directed and acted in The Life and Deeds of the Immortal Leader Karađorđe, the first Serbian feature film, which Botorić produced. Stanojević also helped write the film's screenplay. After making the film, Stanojević returned to the stage, and remained a theatrical performer for the remainder of his career.

References

20th-century Serbian male actors
1859 births
1930 deaths
19th-century comedians